George Pulliam was an American ice hockey defenceman who played for Dartmouth just after World War II.

Career
Pulliam graduated from Cranston High School. In 1947 he helped Dartmouth capture the Thompson Trophy for the Intercollegiate championship, awarded to the best college team in North America.

Awards and honors

References

External links
 

Date of birth unknown
American men's ice hockey defensemen
Ice hockey players from Rhode Island
Dartmouth Big Green men's ice hockey players
Sportspeople from Cranston, Rhode Island
AHCA Division I men's ice hockey All-Americans